Drelów  is a village in Biała Podlaska County, Lublin Voivodeship, in eastern Poland. It is the seat of the gmina (administrative district) called Gmina Drelów.

The village has a population of 900.

On 17 January 1874 the Russian Army killed 23 Greek Catholics (Uniates) who were protesting against the Russification and confiscation of the church.

Notable people
 Franciszek Stefaniuk, Polish politician

See also
 Pratulin Martyrs

References

Villages in Biała Podlaska County
Podlachian Voivodeship
Siedlce Governorate
Lublin Governorate
Lublin Voivodeship (1919–1939)